Apulia is a region of southern Italy.

Apulia may also refer to:
 Apulia, part of several historic regions known as Apulia and Calabria
 Apulia (microcontinent), a small tectonic plate
 Apúlia, a town in Portugal

See also 
 Puglia (disambiguation)
 Apulians (disambiguation)
 Apulia Station, New York